Adelino Fontoura Chaves (March 30, 1859 – May 2, 1884) was a Brazilian poet, actor and journalist. He is the patron of the 1st chair of the Brazilian Academy of Letters.

Life
Adelino Fontoura was born in the city of Axixá, in Maranhão, to Antônio Fontoura Chaves and Francisca Dias Fontoura.

Since as a child, he would have a very strong friendship with future author Artur Azevedo.

Moving to Recife, he would work at the satirical journal Os Xênios. Returning to Maranhão, he initiated his artistical career, performing in a play that would make him arrested. After this incident, he moved to Rio de Janeiro.

He tried the artistic and the journalistic career, failing in the first one. He wrote for journals Folha Nova, O Combate and A Gazetinha, where he published some poems and works in prose — and, in this last one, he would collaborate once more with Azevedo, who was its founder. Alongside Ferreira de Menezes, Augusto Ribeiro, Hugo Leal and João de Almeida, he would work for the journal A Gazeta da Tarde, that was, according to Múcio Leão, "one of the most ill-fated journals ever founded", because its founders would die in the next three years after the journal's existence.

After the Gazeta da Tarde was bought by José do Patrocínio, Adelino becomes its correspondent in Paris. Already very sick, his situation got worse due to the harsh French winter, what made him move to Lisbon in an unsuccessful attempt to get better.

He died with only 25 years, without publishing any book.

Work
As mentioned above, Fontoura's work is very sparse, as he did not published anything during his lifetime. Attempts of compiling his poetry were made during the 1940s and 1950s by Múcio Leão.

His most well-known poem is the sonnet "Celeste".

External links
 Works by Fontoura at the official site of the Brazilian Academy of Letters 
 Fontoura's biography at the official site of the Brazilian Academy of Letters 

1859 births
1884 deaths
People from Maranhão
Brazilian male actors
Brazilian journalists
19th-century Brazilian male actors
Patrons of the Brazilian Academy of Letters
Portuguese-language writers
19th-century journalists
Male journalists
19th-century Brazilian poets
Brazilian male poets
19th-century Brazilian male writers